Kim Domingo (born February 3, 1995), is a Filipino actress, model, Internet personality, television presenter and singer.  She is well known for playing the leading antagonist in Juan Happy Love Story, Tsuperhero and Super Ma'am. She is currently a GMA Network contract artist.

Early life
Domingo was born on February 3, 1995, and was raised in Novaliches, Quezon City. She is the only child to a French father, Guy Belleville, and a Filipino mother, Fina Domingo. Since her parents separated and never got married, she possesses her mother's surname. According to her, she was a "Lolas (Grandma's) girl" raised in a strict household single-handedly by her grandmother. She graduated from elementary school at the San Agustin Elementary School, Quezon City, where Domingo said she was a shy pupil. She attended Our Lady of Fatima University and took up dentistry.

Career
Domingo rose to prominence with her dubsmash of the song "Twerk It Like Miley" in 2014. She signed a contract with GMA Network's talent agency the following year, and landed roles on Juan Happy Love Story and Bubble Gang, where she is currently a mainstay. Domingo appeared on the cover of FHM Philippines December 2015 and January 2017 issues.

Domingo signed a recording contract with GMA Records in August 2016. She released her debut and only single "Know Me" featuring international rapper C-Tru. Domingo was introduced by Ginebra San Miguel as their 2017 calendar girl in October 2016.

Filmography

Television

|-
| 2023 || John Cesar Apelis Story || Kim Cruz
|}

Film

Discography

Single

References

External links

https://www.gmanetwork.com/sparkle/artists/kimdomingo

1995 births
Living people
Filipino film actresses
Filipino child actresses
Filipino female models
Filipina gravure idols
Filipino people of French descent
Our Lady of Fatima University alumni
People from Quezon City
Filipino television actresses
21st-century Filipino women singers
TV5 (Philippine TV network) personalities
GMA Network personalities
GMA Music artists